Henk Schijvenaar (31 May 1918 – 17 September 1996) was a Dutch footballer. He competed in the men's tournament at the 1948 Summer Olympics.

References

External links

1918 births
1996 deaths
Dutch footballers
Netherlands international footballers
Olympic footballers of the Netherlands
Footballers at the 1948 Summer Olympics
Footballers from Haarlem
Association football defenders
HFC EDO players